Straight is an unincorporated community in Texas County in the Oklahoma Panhandle, United States.

Straight is located 13.69 miles west of Hooker and 15 miles north of Guymon. Oklahoma State Highway 135 passes two miles to the west and the community of Mouser is two miles to the east. Pony Creek (a tributary to the Beaver River), flows past to the southwest of the community and Wild Horse Lake is approximately two miles to the north.

The Beaver, Meade and Englewood Railroad built through the area in the 1929-1930 timeframe, and Straight was purposely sited along its tracks.  That line was abandoned in 1972.

References

Unincorporated communities in Texas County, Oklahoma
Unincorporated communities in Oklahoma